The canton of Honfleur-Deauville is an administrative division of the Calvados department, northwestern France. It was created at the French canton reorganisation which came into effect in March 2015. Its seat is in Honfleur.

It consists of the following communes:

Ablon
Barneville-la-Bertran
Cricquebœuf
Deauville
Équemauville
Fourneville
Genneville
Gonneville-sur-Honfleur
Honfleur
Pennedepie
Quetteville
La Rivière-Saint-Sauveur
Saint-Gatien-des-Bois
Le Theil-en-Auge
Touques
Trouville-sur-Mer
Villerville

References

Cantons of Calvados (department)